The Magic Comic was a British comics magazine. It was the ill-fated third comics magazine from DC Thomson (after The Beano and The Dandy). It was aimed at a younger audience, with more emphasis on picture stories. The first issue was published on 22 July 1939. The comic ran for only 80 issues until 25 January 1941. Paper rationing resulting from the outbreak of the Second World War caused its demise. Its Editor Bill Powrie promised that 'the Magic' would return; however, he was killed in action in 1942.

Two annuals, named The Magic Fun Book, were also published in 1941 and 1942. From 1943 to 1949, The Magic Comic would share its annual with The Beano, under the title, The Magic-Beano Book. The cover star was Koko the Pup who would later team up with Big Eggo in the Magic-Beano Books between 1943 and 1950 in the story named Eggo and Koko.

A first issue of The Magic comic was sold on eBay in February 2006 for £1,250 to a collector, and it was one of only 6 copies known to exist. A 'Very Fine' copy was also sold in 1997 for £2,975. On 20 January 2015 the first 24 issues of The Magic Comic were sold for £13,000 (+20% commission; 15,600); it came to £650 per comic.

On 31 January 1976 DC Thomson revived the Magic Comic. This incarnation would go on to last until 1979. The new version was aimed at younger audience than The Beano and Dandy and was more of a pre-school comic than the original Magic comic. The comic was loosely concerned with magic of all kinds. Even though this new comic was considered a revival it contained none of the characters that appeared in the earlier Magic. However it did contain characters from The Beano with a spinoff of Biffo the Bear involving his niece and nephew, Cuddly and Dudley, appearing in the new comic.

Comic strips featured in the first comic
 Koko the Pup (The comic's cover star featuring an anthropomorphic dog.)
 Dolly Dimple, not so simple
 Peter Piper (Drawn by Dudley Watkins this comic strip featured a boy with magical pipes that could bring statues to life. It was revived in the Dandy in the 1990s.)
 Boy Biffo the Brave
 Uncle Dan The Magic man
 The Boy with the Golden Goose
 Cheeky Mary – The Lord Mayors Daughter
 Tell-Tale Tilly
 Sam Swell
 Little Squirty
 The Adventures of Grandfather Clock
 The Tickler Twins in Wonderland (About a pair of twins living in a world full of characters from popular fairy tales and nursery rhymes. The Beano character Pansy Potter would later have her own in Wonderland series.)
 Pa, Ma and Squeaker
 Oompah Pete
 Ugly Muggins
 Wee Hi Lo
 Poor Blind Billy
 The Seven-Foot Cowboy
 Val in the Magic Forest
 The Magic Joke Page
 Inky, Binky and Bluff
 Sooty Snowball (The main character of this comic strip was a black caricature who was dressed in nothing but a grass skirt. It appeared on the comic's back cover.)
 Leave It to Lop Ears
 Crusty Crosspatch
 The Wolf Boy of Badenoch
 Old Pop Pelican
 Tootsy McTurk (A comic strip about a man with unusually large feet. A similar strip called Claude Hopper would later appear in the Dandy.)
 Sammy's Magic Stone
 Herr Paul Fry – The Nasty Spy
 Ding-Dong Dally
 Little Orphan Andy
 Old Father Time
 Kipper Feet
 Beric the Caveboy
 Dizzy Duck
 Dick Turpentine the hopeless highway man
 Dirty Dick – The Chimney Sweep
 Stone-Age Steve
 Young Buffalo Bill
 Two Wanderers of the War
 Softie Sam
 Gulliver
 Keeper of the Flock
 Hiram Scaram – The Stagecoach Driver
 Robin Hood
 Pete of the Spitfires
 Bandy Legs

Comic strips featured in the revived comic
 Witch Wanda
 Elfey
 Rainbow Road (about children in neighbouring houses with each door painted a different colour of the rainbow)
 Copy Cat
 Betsy's Magic Bracelet (a serial about a girl who owned a bracelet with lucky charms enchanted by a friendly witch)
 Flying Flapears (a flying rabbit)
 Spaceship Lollipop
 Aladdin and his Magic Lamp
 The Magic Club (including "Magic Pictures", "Magic Mirror" and "Magic Riddles")
 Cuddly and Dudley (this was a spin-off from The Beano's Biffo the Bear)
 Peter Popin and his Magic Popup Book (a boy who could "fly through time and space" into the worlds within his popup book)
 Tommy Trix
 A Talk with Stubby Pencil
 Magic Playtime
 Penny and the Prince
 The Magic of... (on the back cover, a factual article about the wonders of the world).

References

DC Thomson Comics titles
Comics magazines published in the United Kingdom
Defunct British comics
British humour comics
1939 comics debuts
1941 comics endings
1976 comics debuts
1979 comics endings